The 2000 Jarafa mosque massacre was an attack on members of Ansar al-Sunna praying at a mosque in Jarafa, a village in the outskirts of Omdurman, Sudan on December 8, 2000. A lone gunman, Abbas al-Baqir Abbas ( عباس الباقر عباس ), a member of Takfir wal-Hijra, opened fire with a Kalashnikov assault rifle during evening prayers, killing at least 22 people and injuring more than 30 others, before he was shot dead by police.

Shooting
During evening prayers, at about 9:00 p.m., 33-year-old Abbas al-Baqir Abbas, using a Kalashnikov assault rifle, began shooting through a window at the people in the al-Sunna al-Mohammediyya Mosque in Jarafa, instantly killing 20 worshipers. According to witnesses, he avoided the women's section of the mosque and reassured a fleeing woman that he would only shoot males. When he refused to surrender to responding police units, Abbas was killed after a brief shootout with officers. Thirty-three were wounded in the attack, among them a police officer. At least two of the injured later died of their wounds.

Although Abbas acted alone, according to police, witnesses stated that shots were fired from three directions and that there had been at least three attackers dressed in jellabiyas, all but one fleeing before police arrived. There were also reports that not only worshipers at the mosque were attacked, but that the gunman had rampaged through the village, killing at least two boys. Various higher death tolls were reported, ranging from 23 and 24 to 27 people killed and 49 wounded.

Background

Takfir wal-Hijra
Takfir wal-Hijra is a Muslim extremist group, originating in Egypt, that had a history of differences with the pacifist Ansar al-Sunna. While the former believes the Sharia should be implemented by force, the latter does not. This conflict has resulted in similar incidents previously. On February 4, 1994, three assailants, Mohammed Abdullah al-Khilaifi, a Libyan Islamist, along with two Sudanese, attacked a mosque of Ansar al-Sunna in Al Thawra with assault rifles, killing 19 people and injuring 15. al-Khilaifi was later sentenced to death and executed on September 19, 1994.

On January 1, 1996, eight assailants and a police officer were killed in a fight between members of the group and police in Kambo Ashara when the former tried to force villagers to convert. An attack on the same mosque in Jarafa in 1996 left 12 people dead. On November 1, 1997, two members of Takfir wal-Hijra attacked people leaving a mosque in Arkawit with knives, killing two and wounding a further ten.

Abbas al-Baqir Abbas

Abbas al-Baqir Abbas (1967-December 8, 2000) was from Al-Dasis in the northern part of Al Jazirah. It was reported that his mother had left their home due to his religious fanaticism and that he beat his sister, accusing her of infidelity. He studied economics at Tripoli University, but was forced to leave Libya because of leading Islamist groups and thus threatening security. He was a former member of the Popular Defense Forces, fighting rebels in the southern part of Sudan.

Initially being a member of Ansar al-Sunna, Abbas left due to religious differences and joined Takfir wal-Hijra. It was said that he had repeatedly threatened members of Ansar al-Sunna with an attack similar to the one in 1994. Because of these threats, he was arrested in 1998 for four months, and again a few months prior to the shooting, along with 20 other people suspected of being members of Takfir wal-Hijra. However, he repented and claimed to have abandoned the group and its ideas, and as a result, he was released.

Aftermath
The following day, President Omar al-Bashir visited the mosque, paying his condolences to relatives of the victims and assured that a legislation would be passed to control fanatical religious groups, vowing "to rectify laws in order to protect society from destructive and harmful ideas.". In the wake of the massacre, police and security forces were deployed in Khartoum State in a large scale inspection campaign to prevent further violence, leading to the arresting of 65 leading members of Takfir wal-Hijra and security laws were tightened, allowing law enforcement to detain suspects for up to six months. The amendments were criticized by opposition parties for curtailing liberties and they accused President Bashir of abusing the incident to increase his power.

References

External links
Gunman kills twenty in mosque massacre, The Daily Telegraph (December 9, 2000)
Gunman kills 20 at mosque near Sudanese capital, The Independent (December 9, 2000)
Mosque shooting incident leaves 20 dead
Sudan: Gunman opens fire in mosque, Associated Press (December 9, 2000) (Video)
Sudan: Gunman opens fire in mosque, Associated Press (December 9, 2000) (Video)

Attacks in Africa in 2000
Deaths by firearm in Sudan
December 2000 events in Africa
Islamist attacks on mosques
Mass murder in 2000
Massacres in religious buildings and structures
Massacres in Sudan
Massacres of men
Spree shootings in Sudan
Terrorist incidents in Africa in 2000
Terrorist incidents in Sudan
Violence against men in Africa
2000 murders in Sudan
Terrorist incidents in Sudan in the 2000s